El-Said Badawi (El-Saʿīd Muḥammad Badawī) was a scholar and linguist and author of many works, both in English and in Arabic, dealing with various aspects of the Arabic language.

Having learned the Qur'an by the age of ten in his village, El-Nakhas, Sharqiyya Governorate, he attended Al-Azhar University for his secondary schooling. He received a B.A. in Arabic Language & Literature and Islamic Studies from Cairo University, an M.A. in General Linguistics and Phonetics from the University of London, and his Ph.D. in Experimental Phonetics from the University of London.

After obtaining his Ph.D. Badawi briefly taught linguistics at the University of Cairo, then began teaching Arabic literature and linguistics at Omdurman University in Sudan, and moved to the American University in Cairo in 1969, where he became the Curriculum Advisor for the Center for Arabic Study Abroad (CASA) in 1970.

Badawi's wide-ranging interests included colloquial Egyptian Arabic, classical Arabic as found in the Qur'an, and the teaching of Arabic as a foreign language. In the field of sociolinguistics, perhaps Badawi's best known work is Mustawayāt al-ʻArabīyah al-muʻāṣirah fī Miṣr (Levels of Contemporary Arabic in Egypt) wherein he challenges the traditional simplistic dichotomy of Classical and Colloquial Arabic, proposing instead a more subtle analysis involving several levels of usage.

Works

English 
An intonational study of colloquial Riyadhi Arabic.	1965	(Ph.D. thesis)
A comprehensive study of Egyptian Arabic.	1978	(coauthored with E.T. Abdel-Massih et al.)
A reference grammar of Egyptian Arabic.	1979	(coauthored with E.T. Abdel-Massih et al.)
A comprehensive study of Egyptian Arabic 2. Proverbs and metaphoric expressions	1981	(coauthored with E.T. Abdel-Massih et al.)
A dictionary of Egyptian Arabic : Arabic-English.	1986	(coauthored with M. Hinds)
Sultan Qaboos encyclopedia of Arab names 2, Treasury of Arab Names, in four volumes.	1991	(coauthored with M. Al-Zubair)
Modern written Arabic : a comprehensive grammar.	2002	
Arabic-English dictionary of Qur'anic usage.	2007

Arabic 
Mustawayāt al-ʻArabīyah al-muʻāṣirah fī Miṣr : baḥth fī ʻalāqat al-lughah bi-al-ḥaḍārah.	1973
Muʻjam asmāʼ al-ʻArab.	1991
Dalīl aʻlām ʻUmān.	1991
al-Kitāb al-asāsī fī taʻlīm al-lughah al-ʻArabīyah li-ghayr al-nāṭiqīn bi-hā.	2006
Buḥūth lughawīyah wa-tarbawīyah fī qaḍāyā al-ʻArabīyah al-muʻāṣirah wa-mushkilātihā.	2015

External links 
 Arabic-English Dictionary of Qur'anic Usage
  A Dictionary of Egyptian Arabic: Arabic - English

References 

Linguists from Egypt
Egyptian philologists
Arab grammarians
Sociolinguists
Dialectologists
20th-century linguists
21st-century linguists
1929 births
2014 deaths
People from Zagazig
Al-Azhar University alumni
Cairo University alumni
Alumni of the University of London